The Taming of Sunnybrook Nell is a 1914 American silent short drama film directed by Sydney Ayres, written by Harry Wulze and starring  William Garwood, Louise Lester and Vivian Rich.

Cast
William Garwood as Steve, a woodcutter
Louise Lester as Mrs. Durkin
Vivian Rich as Sunnybrook Nell, his daughter
Jack Richardson as Clifford Durkin
Harry von Meter as Old Clon, a mountaineer

External links

1914 drama films
1914 films
Silent American drama films
American silent short films
American black-and-white films
1914 short films
Films directed by Sydney Ayres
1910s American films